Floberg is a surname of Swedish origin. Notable people with the surname include:

Bjørn Floberg (born 1947), Norwegian actor 
John F. Floberg (1915–2011), United States Assistant Secretary of the Navy

References

Surnames of Swedish origin